Yitzhak Casspi was an Israeli footballer who played in Maccabi Netanya.

Casspi's brother Ze'ev also played professional football as a goalkeeper, both played together in Netanya.

Honours
Israel State Cup:
Runner-up (1): 1954

References

1922 births
2017 deaths
Israeli Jews
Israeli footballers
Maccabi Netanya F.C. players
Maccabi Netanya F.C. managers
Liga Leumit players
Footballers from Netanya
Israeli people of Iranian-Jewish descent
Association football forwards
Israeli football managers